Guillermo Perry Rubio (died 27 September 2019) was a Colombian economist and politician who served as Minister of Mines and Energy and Minister of Finance and Public Credit.

References

1940s births
2019 deaths
Ministers of Mines and Energy of Colombia
Ministers of Finance and Public Credit of Colombia
Colombian economists